William or Bill Hughes may refer to:

Politics
 Billy Hughes (1862–1952), Prime Minister of Australia during WWI
 William Hughes (Wisconsin politician) (1841–1899), member of the Wisconsin State Assembly
 William Hughes (U.S. senator) (1872–1918), U.S. Representative and Senator from New Jersey
 William Hughes (Brooklyn), Assemblyman in the 117th New York State Legislature (1894)
 William Hughes, Baron Hughes (1911–1999), Scottish Labour party politician
 William Hughes, 1st Baron Dinorben (1767–1852), British industrialist, politician and benefactor
 William Bulkeley Hughes (1797–1882), Welsh politician
 William Clark Hughes (1868–1930), Speaker of the Louisiana House of Representatives
 William Edgar Hughes (1840–1918), member of the Texas House of Representatives
 William H. Hughes (1864–1903), American businessman and politician from New York
 William J. Hughes (1932–2019), U.S. Representative from New Jersey and ambassador
 William M. Hughes, member of the Los Angeles City Council, California

Religion
 William Hughes (bishop of St Asaph) (died 1600), Welsh Anglican bishop
 William Hughes (Methodist bishop) (1877–1940), American bishop of the Central jurisdiction
 William Hughes (bishop of Covington) (1921–2013), American Roman Catholic bishop

Sports
 Bill Hughes (American football) (1915–1978), American football player
 Bill Hughes (cricketer) (1859–1934), New Zealand cricketer
 Bill Hughes (first baseman) (1860–1928), baseball player
 Bill Hughes (pitcher) (1896–1963), American baseball player in 1921
 Bill Hughes (ice hockey) (born 1947), Canadian ice hockey goaltender
 William L. Hughes (1895–?), American college football player and coach
 William Hughes (footballer, born 1865) (1865–?), English footballer for Liverpool
 William Hughes (1910s footballer) (1889–1955), English footballer for Halifax Town and Bradford City
 William Hughes (born 1998) (1998–2018), Welsh boxer and child actor
 Willie Hughes (footballer) (1909–1996), Scottish footballer for Celtic and Clyde

Other
 Bill Hughes (musician) (1930–2018), American jazz musician
 Bill Hughes (police officer) (born 1950), Director General of Britain's Serious Organised Crime Agency
 William Hughes (As the World Turns), a fictional character on the American soap opera As the World Turns
 William Hughes (geographer) (1818–1876), British mapmaker, professor of geography and author
 William Hughes (professor), British professor of Gothic studies, and author/editor of several books on Bram Stoker and the Gothic
 William Hughes (writer) (1803–1861), British writer on law and angling
 W. A. Hughes (William Alexander Hughes, 1816–1892), town clerk of Adelaide, South Australia
 William C. Hughes, lawyer in Oklahoma
 Willie Hughes (16th century), possible dedicatee of Shakespeare's sonnets

See also
 Billy Hughes (disambiguation)
 Billie Hughes (1948–1998), American songwriter, musician, and record producer
 Hughes (surname)